The 2021–22 Iona Gaels men's basketball team represented Iona College in the 2021–22 NCAA Division I men's basketball season. The Gaels, led by second-year head coach Rick Pitino, played their home games at the Hynes Athletic Center in New Rochelle, New York as members of the Metro Atlantic Athletic Conference. They finished the season 25-8, 17-3 in MAAC Play to finish as regular season champions. They were upset in the quarterfinals of the MAAC tournament by Rider. As a No. 1 seed who failed to win their conference tournament, they received an automatic bid to the National Invitation Tournament where they lost in the first round to Florida.

Previous season
In a season limited due to the ongoing COVID-19 pandemic, the Gaels finished the season 12–6, 6–3 in MAAC play to finish in a tie for ninth place. As the No. 9 seed in the MAAC tournament, they defeated Quinnipiac, Siena, and Niagara to advance to the tournament championship game. There they defeated Fairfield to win the tournament championship. As a result, they received the conference's automatic bid to the NCAA tournament as the No. 15 seed in the East region, losing in the first round to Alabama.

Roster

Schedule and results

|-
!colspan=12 style=""| Regular season

|-
!colspan=12 style=""| 2022 MAAC tournament
|-

|-
!colspan=12 style=""| NIT tournament

Source

Rankings

References

Iona Gaels men's basketball seasons
Iona Gaels
Iona Gaels men's basketball
Iona Gaels men's basketball
Iona